The 2011–12 Portland Trail Blazers season was the 42nd season of the franchise in the National Basketball Association (NBA). Due to the 2011 NBA lockout the regular season was shortened to 66 games. The Trail Blazers finished the season in 11th place in the Western Conference with a 28–38 record. It was the last season with head coach Nate McMillan, who was fired on March and with starting shooting guard Brandon Roy, who announced his retirement. The Trail Blazers also parted ways with their number one pick from the 2007 NBA draft Greg Oden after an injury-marred short career with the team.

Key dates
 June 23: The 2011 NBA draft took place at the Prudential Center in Newark, New Jersey.

Draft

Roster

Pre-season

Game log

|- bgcolor="ccffcc"
| 1
| December 19
| Utah
| 
| Wesley Matthews (17)
| Chris Johnson (6)
| Jamal Crawford (7)
| Rose Garden
| 1–0
|- bgcolor="ffcccc"
| 2
| December 21
| @ Utah
| 
| Raymond Felton (17)
| LaMarcus Aldridge (11)
| Jamal Crawford (5)
| EnergySolutions Arena
| 1–1

Regular season

Standings

Record vs. opponents

Game log

|- bgcolor=#ccffcc
| 1
| December 26
| Philadelphia
| 
| LaMarcus Aldridge (25)
| Marcus Camby (13)
| Raymond Felton (8)
| Rose Garden20,509
| 1–0
|- bgcolor=#ccffcc
| 2
| December 27
| Sacramento
| 
| Gerald Wallace (25)
| Marcus Camby (9)
| Raymond Felton (6)
| Rose Garden20,350
| 2–0
|- bgcolor=#ccffcc
| 3
| December 29
| Denver
| 
| Wes Matthews (25)
| Marcus Camby (12)
| LaMarcus Aldridge (6)
| Rose Garden20,531
| 3–0

|- bgcolor=#ffcccc
| 4
| January 1
| @ L. A. Clippers
| 
| Jamal Crawford (23)
| LaMarcus Aldridge (9)
| Raymond Felton (8)
| Staples Center19,060
| 3–1
|- bgcolor=#ccffcc
| 5
| January 3
| @ Oklahoma City
| 
| LaMarcus Aldridge (30)
| Gerald Wallace (10)
| Raymond Felton (7)
| Chesapeake Energy Arena18,203
| 4–1
|- bgcolor=#ccffcc
| 6
| January 5
| L. A. Lakers
| 
| Gerald Wallace (31)
| LaMarcus Aldridge (10)
| Raymond Felton (10)
| Rose Garden20,444
| 5–1
|- bgcolor=#ffcccc
| 7
| January 6
| @ Phoenix
| 
| LaMarcus Aldridge (14)
| Marcus Camby (11)
| Jamal CrawfordNolan Smith (3)
| US Airways Center16,235
| 5–2
|- bgcolor=#ccffcc
| 8
| January 8
| Cleveland
| 
| LaMarcus Aldridge (28)
| Marcus Camby (9)
| Raymond Felton (7)
| Rose Garden20,292
| 6–2
|- bgcolor=#ccffcc
| 9
| January 10
| L. A. Clippers
| 
| Gerald Wallace (20)
| Marcus Camby (11)
| Raymond Felton (8)
| Rose Garden20,381
| 7–2
|- bgcolor=#ffcccc
| 10
| January 11
| Orlando
| 
| Jamal Crawford (24)
| LaMarcus Aldridge (8)
| Raymond Felton (8)
| Rose Garden20,467
| 7–3
|- bgcolor=#ffcccc
| 11
| January 13
| @ San Antonio
| 
| LaMarcus Aldridge (29)
| Gerald Wallace (12)
| Raymond Felton (7)
| AT&T Center18,581
| 7–4
|- bgcolor=#ffcccc
| 12
| January 14
| @ Houston
| 
| Nicolas Batum (29)
| LaMarcus Aldridge (10)
| LaMarcus AldridgeRaymond Felton (5)
| Toyota Center11,676
| 7–5
|- bgcolor=#ccffcc
| 13
| January 16
| @ New Orleans
| 
| LaMarcus Aldridge (22)
| LaMarcus Aldridge (9)
| Raymond Felton (12)
| New Orleans Arena14,759
| 8–5
|- bgcolor=#ffcccc
| 14
| January 18
| @ Atlanta
| 
| Jamal Crawford (22)
| LaMarcus Aldridge (11)
| Raymond Felton (8)
| Philips Arena13,729
| 8–6
|- bgcolor=#ccffcc
| 15
| January 20
| @ Toronto
| 
| LaMarcus Aldridge (33)
| LaMarcus Aldridge (23)
| LaMarcus AldridgeRaymond Felton (5)
| Air Canada Centre17,537
| 9–6
|- bgcolor=#ffcccc
| 16
| January 21
| @ Detroit
| 
| LaMarcus Aldridge (25)
| Nicolas Batum (9)
| Raymond Felton (9)
| The Palace of Auburn Hills14,456
| 9–7
|- bgcolor=#ccffcc
| 17
| January 23
| Sacramento
| 
| Jamal Crawford (26)
| LaMarcus Aldridge (16)
| Three players (5)
| Rose Garden20,363
| 10–7
|- bgcolor=#ccffcc
| 18
| January 24
| Memphis
| 
| LaMarcus Aldridge (23)
| Marcus Camby (22)
| Jamal Crawford (4)
| Rose Garden20,602
| 11–7
|- bgcolor=#ffcccc
| 19
| January 25
| @ Golden State
| 
| LaMarcus Aldridge (18)
| Marcus Camby (16)
| Raymond Felton (7)
| Oracle Arena17,923
| 11–8
|- bgcolor=#ccffcc
| 20
| January 27
| Phoenix
| 
| LaMarcus Aldridge (23)
| Marcus Camby (20)
| Jamal Crawford (10)
| Rose Garden20,664
| 12–8
|- bgcolor=#ffcccc
| 21
| January 30
| @ Utah
| 
| LaMarcus Aldridge (25)
| Gerald Wallace (9)
| Raymond Felton (7)
| EnergySolutions Arena19,328
| 12–9

|- bgcolor=#ccffcc
| 22
| February 1
| Charlotte
| 
| Jamal Crawford (24)
| Marcus Camby (7)
| Raymond Felton (7)
| Rose Garden20,608
| 13–9
|- bgcolor=#ffcccc
| 23
| February 2
| @ Sacramento
| 
| LaMarcus Aldridge (28)
| LaMarcus Aldridge (14)
| Raymond Felton (10)
| Power Balance Pavilion11,740
| 13–10
|- bgcolor=#ccffcc
| 24
| February 4
| Denver
| 
| Nicolas Batum (33)
| Marcus Camby (20)
| Jamal Crawford (8)
| Rose Garden20,583
| 14–10
|- bgcolor=#ffcccc
| 25
| February 6
| Oklahoma City
| 
| LaMarcus Aldridge (39)
| Marcus Camby (15)
| Jamal Crawford (5)
| Rose Garden20,559
| 14–11
|- bgcolor=#ffcccc
| 26
| February 8
| Houston
| 
| Jamal Crawford (21)
| Gerald Wallace (9)
| Jamal CrawfordRaymond Felton (6)
| Rose Garden20,350
| 14–12
|- bgcolor=#ccffcc
| 27
| February 10
| @ New Orleans
| 
| Jamal Crawford (31)
| LaMarcus AldridgeMarcus Camby (7)
| Jamal Crawford (8)
| New Orleans Arena14,421
| 15–12
|- bgcolor=#ffcccc
| 28
| February 11
| @ Dallas
| 
| LaMarcus Aldridge (33)
| LaMarcus Aldridge (12)
| Nicolas Batum (3)
| American Center20,457
| 15–13
|- bgcolor=#ffcccc
| 29
| February 14
| Washington
| 
| Nicolas Batum (33)
| Marcus Camby (12)
| Gerald Wallace (8)
| Rose Garden20,558
| 15–14
|- bgcolor=#ccffcc
| 30
| February 15
| @ Golden State
| 
| Gerald Wallace (24)
| Marcus Camby (11)
| Jamal CrawfordRaymond Felton (6)
| Oracle Arena17,934
| 16–14
|- bgcolor=#ffcccc
| 31
| February 16
| L. A. Clippers
| 
| Nicolas BatumJamal Crawford (19)
| Three players (6)
| Marcus CambyGerald Wallace (4)
| Rose Garden20,665
| 16–15
|- bgcolor=#ccffcc
| 32
| February 18
| Atlanta
| 
| Nicolas Batum (22)
| LaMarcus AldridgeKurt Thomas (10)
| Raymond Felton (8)
| Rose Garden20,635
| 17–15
|- bgcolor=#ffcccc
| 33
| February 20
| @ L. A. Lakers
| 
| LaMarcus AldridgeNicolas Batum (18)
| Marcus Camby (13)
| Nicolas BatumJamal Crawford (5)
| Staples Center18,997
| 17–16
|- bgcolor=#ccffcc
| 34
| February 21
| San Antonio
| 
| LaMarcus Aldridge (21)
| Gerald Wallace (10)
| Jamal Crawford (8)
| Rose Garden20,567
| 18–16
|- align="center"
|colspan="9" bgcolor="#bbcaff"|All-Star Break
|- bgcolor=#ffcccc
| 35
| February 29
| @ Denver
| 
| Jamal Crawford (21)
| LaMarcus Aldridge (9)
| Raymond Felton (7)
| Pepsi Center15,715
| 18–17

|- bgcolor=#ffcccc
| 36
| March 1
| Miami
| 
| LaMarcus Aldridge (20)
| Marcus CambyWesley Matthews (7)
| Three players (4)
| Rose Garden20,597
| 18–18
|- bgcolor=#ffcccc
| 37
| March 3
| Minnesota
| 
| Nicolas Batum (29)
| Gerald Wallace (14)
| LaMarcus AldridgeRaymond Felton (4)
| Rose Garden20,644
| 18–19
|- bgcolor=#ccffcc
| 38
| March 5
| New Orleans
| 
| Nicolas Batum (19)
| Marcus Camby (16)
| Raymond Felton (10)
| Rose Garden20,520
| 19–19
|- bgcolor=#ffcccc
| 39
| March 7
| @ Minnesota
| 
| Raymond Felton (23)
| Gerald Wallace (9)
| Raymond Felton, Gerald Wallace (9)
| Target Center17,118
| 19–20
|- bgcolor=#ffcccc
| 40
| March 9
| @ Boston
| 
| LaMarcus Aldridge (22)
| Marcus Camby (10)
| Raymond Felton (4)
| TD Garden18,624
| 19–21
|- bgcolor=#ccffcc
| 41
| March 10
| @ Washington
| 
| LaMarcus Aldridge (30)
| LaMarcus Aldridge (10)
| Jamal CrawfordRaymond Felton (5)
| Verizon Center18,071
| 20–21
|- bgcolor=#ffcccc
| 42
| March 13
| @ Indiana
| 
| LaMarcus Aldridge (17)
| Joel PrzybillaGerald Wallace (6)
| Raymond Felton (2)
| Bankers Life Fieldhouse10,933
| 20–22
|- bgcolor=#ffcccc
| 43
| March 14
| @ New York
| 
| LaMarcus AldridgeGerald Wallace (15)
| Gerald Wallace (12)
| Raymond FeltonGerald Wallace (3)
| Madison Square Garden19,763
| 20–23
|- bgcolor=#ccffcc
| 44
| March 16
| @ Chicago
| 
| LaMarcus Aldridge (21)
| Nicolas Batum (9)
| Raymond Felton (5)
| United Center22,022
| 21–23
|- bgcolor=#ffcccc
| 45
| March 18
| @ Oklahoma City
| 
| Jamal Crawford (23)
| Joel Przybilla (11)
| Raymond Felton (7)
| Chesapeake Energy Arena18,203
| 21–24
|- bgcolor=#ffcccc
| 46
| March 20
| Milwaukee
| 
| LaMarcus AldridgeWesley Matthews (21)
| LaMarcus Aldridge (12)
| Raymond Felton (9)
| Rose Garden20,387
| 21–25
|- bgcolor=#ccffcc
| 47
| March 22
| Memphis
| 
| Nicolas Batum (24)
| Wesley Matthews (9)
| Raymond Felton (9)
| Rose Garden20,636
| 22–25
|- bgcolor=#ffcccc
| 48
| March 23
| @ L. A. Lakers
| 
| LaMarcus Aldridge (29)
| LaMarcus Aldridge (9)
| Raymond Felton (6)
| Staples Center18,997
| 22–26
|- bgcolor=#ccffcc
| 49
| March 25
| Golden State
| 
| Raymond Felton (24)
| LaMarcus Aldridge (9)
| Raymond Felton (7)
| Rose Garden20,636
| 23–26
|- bgcolor=#ffcccc
| 50
| March 27
| Oklahoma City
| 
| J. J. Hickson (21)
| LaMarcus Aldridge (8)
| Jonny Flynn (5)
| Rose Garden20,626
| 23–27
|- bgcolor=#ccffcc
| 51
| March 29
| New Orleans
| 
| LaMarcus Aldridge (25)
| LaMarcus Aldridge (12)
| Raymond Felton (10)
| Rose Garden20,499
| 24–27
|- bgcolor=#ffcccc
| 52
| March 30
| @ L. A. Clippers
| 
| J. J. Hickson (29)
| J. J. Hickson (13)
| Raymond Felton (8)
| Staples Center19,060
| 24–28

|- bgcolor=#ccffcc
| 53
| April 1
| Minnesota
| 
| LaMarcus Aldridge (26)
| J. J. Hickson (9)
| Raymond Felton (11)
| Rose Garden20,359
| 25–28
|- bgcolor=#ffcccc
| 54
| April 2
| Utah
| 
| Wesley Matthews (33)
| Nicolas Batum (10)
| Raymond Felton (8)
| Rose Garden20,050
| 25–29
|- bgcolor=#ccffcc
| 55
| April 4
| New Jersey
| 
| LaMarcus Aldridge (24)
| Nicolas Batum (10)
| Raymond Felton (9)
| Rose Garden20,464
| 26–29
|- bgcolor=#ccffcc
| 56
| April 6
| @ Dallas
| 
| Raymond Felton (30)
| LaMarcus Aldridge (12)
| Raymond Felton (6)
| American Center20,544
| 27–29
|- bgcolor=#ffcccc
| 57
| April 7
| @ Milwaukee
| 
| LaMarcus Aldridge (21)
| Joel Przybilla (10)
| Raymond Felton (10)
| Bradley Center14,969
| 27–30
|- bgcolor=#ffcccc
| 58
| April 9
| Houston
| 
| LaMarcus Aldridge (20)
| J. J. Hickson (10)
| Raymond Felton (8)
| Rose Garden20,487
| 27–31
|- bgcolor=#ccffcc
| 59
| April 11
| Golden State
| 
| J. J. Hickson (23)
| Joel Przybilla (14)
| Raymond Felton (10)
| Rose Garden20,502
| 28–31
|- bgcolor=#ffcccc
| 60
| April 13
| Dallas
| 
| Nicolas Batum (20)
| J. J. Hickson (10)
| Jonny Flynn (5)
| Rose Garden20,304
| 28–32
|- bgcolor=#ffcccc
| 61
| April 15
| @ Sacramento
| 
| Wesley Matthews (31)
| J. J. Hickson (13)
| Jonny Flynn (5)
| Power Balance Pavilion16,012
| 28–33
|- bgcolor=#ffcccc
| 62
| April 16
| @ Phoenix
| 
| Jamal CrawfordJ. J. Hickson (22)
| J. J. Hickson (8)
| Jonny Flynn (6)
| US Airways Center15,322
| 28–34
|- bgcolor=#ffcccc
| 63
| April 18
| Utah
| 
| Wesley Matthews (21)
| J. J. Hickson (9)
| Jonny Flynn (7)
| Rose Garden20,545
| 28–35
|- bgcolor=#ffcccc
| 64
| April 21
| @ Memphis
| 
| J. J. Hickson (23)
| J. J. Hickson (13)
| Nolan Smith (6)
| FedExForum17,904
| 28–36
|- bgcolor=#ffcccc
| 65
| April 23
| @ San Antonio
| 
| Wesley Matthews (24)
| J. J. Hickson (10)
| Raymond Felton (7)
| AT&T Center18,581
| 28–37
|- bgcolor=#ffcccc
| 66
| April 26
| @ Utah
| 
| J. J. Hickson (20)
| J. J. Hickson (9)
| Jonny Flynn (11)
| EnergySolutions Arena19,554
| 28–38

Player statistics

Regular season

|- align="center" bgcolor=""
| 
| 55 || 55 ||style=|36.3 || .512 || .182 || .814 || 8.0 || 2.4 || .9 || .8 ||style=|21.7
|- align="center" bgcolor=""
| 
| 40 || 4 || 13.4 || .410 ||style=|.430 || .850 || 2.4 || .4 || .3 || .1 || 5.1
|- align="center" bgcolor=""
| 
| 59 || 34 || 30.4 || .451 || .391 || .836 || 4.6 || 1.4 || 1.0 || 1.0 || 13.9
|- align="center" bgcolor=""
|  
| 40 || 40 || 22.4 || .416 ||  || .474 ||style=|8.9 || 1.9 || .8 ||style=|1.4 || 3.8
|- align="center" bgcolor=""
| 
| 60 || 6 || 26.9 || .384 || .308 ||style=|.927 || 2.0 || 3.2 || .9 || .2 || 14.0
|- align="center" bgcolor=""
| 
| 60 ||style=|56 || 31.8 || .407 || .305 || .806 || 2.5 ||style=|6.5 || 1.3 || .2 || 11.4
|- align="center" bgcolor=""
|  
| 18 || 1 || 15.6 || .378 || .320 || .720 || 1.7 || 3.8 || .2 || .1 || 5.2
|- align="center" bgcolor=""
| 
| 19 || 10 || 31.6 || .543 || .000 || .645 || 8.3 || 1.2 || .6 || .9 || 15.1
|- align="center" bgcolor=""
|  
| 1 || 0 || 5.0 ||style=|1.000 ||  ||  || 1.0 || .0 || 1.0 || .0 || 2.0
|- align="center" bgcolor=""
|  
| 20 || 0 || 4.7 || .478 ||  || .833 || .9 || .1 || .1 || .4 || 1.6
|- align="center" bgcolor=""
| 
|style=|66 || 53 || 33.8 || .412 || .383 || .860 || 3.4 || 1.7 ||style=|1.5 || .2 || 13.7
|- align="center" bgcolor=""
| 
| 27 || 19 || 16.6 || .458 ||  || .611 || 5.1 || .2 || .1 || .6 || 2.0
|- align="center" bgcolor=""
| 
| 47 || 0 || 9.9 || .504 || .000 || .717 || 2.3 || .4 || .3 || .1 || 3.3
|- align="center" bgcolor=""
| 
| 44 || 4 || 12.3 || .372 || .289 || .714 || 1.3 || 1.4 || .4 || .1 || 3.8
|- align="center" bgcolor=""
|  
| 15 || 3 || 7.7 || .444 ||  || .650 || 2.3 || .0 || .1 || .5 || 1.9
|- align="center" bgcolor=""
| 
| 53 || 3 || 15.2 || .465 ||  || .700 || 3.5 || .9 || .5 || .6 || 3.0
|- align="center" bgcolor=""
|  
| 42 || 42 || 35.8 || .472 || .265 || .776 || 6.6 || 2.7 ||style=|1.5 || .6 || 13.3
|- align="center" bgcolor=""
| 
| 24 || 0 || 6.2 || .500 || .296 || .333 || .8 || .3 || .3 || .1 || 3.7
|}
  Statistics with the Portland Trail Blazers.

Awards and records
 Jamal Crawford led the league in free throw percentage with .927.

All-Star
 LaMarcus Aldridge made his first All-Star appearance as a reserve for the West in the 2012 NBA All-Star Game.

Injuries
 Before the start of the regular season, Brandon Roy announced his retirement due to a degenerative knee condition.
 LaMarcus Aldridge underwent heart surgery two weeks before the start of the regular season. Two weeks before the end of the season he had surgery to repair a torn labrum on his right hip.
 In February, Greg Oden, who was scheduled to miss the season after procedures on both of his knees, had microfracture surgery on his left knee.
 Shawne Williams had surgery in February to remove bone fragments from his left foot and missed the remainder of the season.
 In March Elliot Williams had surgery to repair his left dislocated shoulder capsule and was scheduled to miss the remainder of the season.

Transactions

Overview

Trades

Free agents

Many players signed with teams from other leagues due to the 2011 NBA lockout. FIBA allows players under NBA contracts to sign and play for teams from other leagues if the contracts have opt-out clauses that allow the players to return to the NBA if the lockout ends. The Chinese Basketball Association, however, only allows its clubs to sign foreign free agents who could play for at least the entire season.

References

Portland Trail Blazers seasons
Portland Trail Blazers
Portland Trail Blazers 2011
Portland Trail Blazers 2011
Port
Port